Edward Cooke was an Australian swimmer. He competed in two events at the 1908 Summer Olympics.

References

External links
 

Year of birth missing
Year of death missing
Australian male breaststroke swimmers
Australian male butterfly swimmers
Olympic swimmers of Australasia
Swimmers at the 1908 Summer Olympics
Place of birth missing